Trevor John Redmond (16 June 1927 – 17 September 1997) was a New Zealand speedway rider who mainly rode for the Aldershot Shots, and the Wembley Lions. Redmond also opened a speedway track in Neath, Wales in 1962. He later became a promoter of stock car and hot rod racing, mainly in southwest England, through his Autospeed organisation.

Career

Rider
Redmond started riding speedway in 1949 at the Aranui track in Christchurch. He moved to the UK when he won a team place with the newly formed Aldershot Shots in 1950. He was successful enough to attract the Wembley Lions to sign him in 1951, where he remained until their closure in 1956. Whilst with the Lions, Redmond qualified for two World Championship finals.

A season in non-league speedway followed in 1957 but in 1958 he did not ride at all, instead he opened a track in Cornwall at St Austell. He returned to racing for a spell with the Swindon Robins and moved onto the Bristol Bulldogs in 1960. The Bristol track closed at the end of that season and in 1961 Redmond had a brief spell with the Wolverhampton Wolves. In subsequent years he was rider and promoter of league teams at Neath,(1962,) St. Austell,(1963) and Glasgow,(1964-65.) He was one of only 2 riders to appear in all 5 Provincial League Riders Championship Finals, being winner in 1960, and a disappointed Runner-Up in 1961 after a broken chain in his final ride cost him the title.

Promoter
In 1958, Redmond promoted at St Austell, on an open licence, and in 1961, he also promoted open meetings in Dublin (Shelbourne).  In 1962, he opened a track in Neath, Wales. The team was named the Neath Welsh Dragons and operated in the Speedway Provincial League. The team finished in second place, which was considered a remarkable achievement by the speedway press. Neath folded at the start of the 1963 season, so Redmond took the St Austell Gulls into the Provincial League. In 1964 he continued to both ride and promote, but this time with the Glasgow Tigers, which he reopened and operated from the White City Stadium. He stopped finally riding in 1964, but continued to promote the club until the start of the 1967 season. In 1970, Redmond was influential in the reopening of speedway at  Wembley Stadium, with the return of the  Wembley Lions. He was later a member of the FIM and was involved in the administration of international speedway, and he managed New Zealand speedway teams. 
He promoted motor racing at several tracks in southern England, including St Austell, Newton Abbot, St Day, Weymouth, Reading, and two events at Wembley Stadium.
He died at his home in Glastonbury in 1997.

World final appearances
 1952 -  London, Wembley Stadium - Res - Did not ride
 1954 -  London, Wembley Stadium - 13th - 5pts

Trevor set up the business Autospeed and opened tracks in Newton Abbot and St Austell where they raced Bangers, Hot Rods and stock cars. Autospeed were the first to run Auto Rods which were to become the Saloon Stock Cars. They were also the first to run SuperRods which started as Jags and Fords as big engined Hotrods.

References

1927 births
1997 deaths
New Zealand speedway riders
Speedway promoters
Wembley Lions riders
Bristol Bulldogs riders
Wolverhampton Wolves riders
Swindon Robins riders
Glasgow Tigers riders
Aldershot Shots riders
Neath Welsh Dragons riders
St Austell Gulls riders